Sheikh Said Ismagilov - Mufti of the Religious Administration of Muslims of Ukraine “Ummah”, one of Muslim spiritual leaders of Ukraine, President of All-Ukrainian Public Organization “Ukrainian Center for Islamic Studies”, the Head of Muslim Community “Nur” of Donetsk city, the member of Public Organization “Al-Amal” of Donetsk city. Ukrainian scientist majoring in Islamic studies, the member of Donetsk regional cell of Ukrainian Association of Religion Researchers (UARR), the member of a board of directors of Center for Religious Studies and International Spiritual Relationships, the member of Council of Churches and Religious Organizations of Donetsk Region, lecturer of theology and religion in Ukrainian Islamic Institute (2001-2002), prominent public figure.

His main purpose is to raise Muslims of Ukraine as integral part of Ukrainian society.

Biography
Ismagilov, a Volga Tatar, was born on 9 August 1978 in Donetsk. He is married and has one son.

Education
In 1985, S. Ismagilov attended Middle School №60 of Donetsk city.

In 1993, he enrolled into Donetsk Polytechnic College (Department of Engineering Mechanics). In 1997 he graduated from College.

He received religious education at the Department of Theology of Moscow Higher Islamic College (currently Moscow Islamic University). S. Ismagilov graduated 
from University in 1997, obtaining the Diploma with Honours and the title of imam khatib.

He is fluent in 4 languages: Ukrainian, Russian, Tatar, Arabic.

In 2002, S. Ismagilov enrolled into State Institute of Artificial Intellect of Donetsk (Department of Philosophy and Religious Studies). On October 3, 2007, this institute obtained the fourth level of accreditation and became State University of Informatics and Artificial Intellect of Donetsk. Thus, in 2007, S. Ismagilov finished his studies and got two diplomas: 1) Bachelor Degree in Philosophy; 2) Master Degree in Religious Studies.

Religious and Public Activity
Mufti of the Religious Administration of Muslims of Ukraine “Ummah” (October 7, 2009).

Sheikh Said Ismagilov upholds Sunni tradition of Islam and the idea of wasat, which means balanced, "middle way", avoiding extremes and radicalism. He advocates interreligious dialog and tolerance in society.

2002
In 2002, S. Ismagilov became the imam of Donetsk Muslim Community “Duslyk”. He had been holding this position up until 2009. Before this, he occupied the position of imam in Shahtarsk city (Donetsk Oblast).

2009
Since 2009 and onwards, he is a permanent member of “Council of Spiritual Administration of Ukrainian Muslims”.

On January 25, 2009 in Kyiv, he was elected Mufti of the Religious Administration of Muslims of Ukraine “Ummah”, which was registered by order №79 of State Committee on Nationalities and Religions of Ukraine on September 11, 2008.

2011
In 2011, S.Ismagilov was a member of the working group of scholars aimed at canonical translation of meanings of the Quran into Ukrainian language.

2012
In 2012, he was elected Mufti of the Religious Administration of Muslims of Ukraine “Ummah”.

2013
Said Ismagilov, as a citizen of Ukraine, held the pro-Ukrainian demonstration near Taras Shevchenko monument in Donetsk on 24 November 2013. 
On 3 November 2013 he was an active participant of the Revolution of Dignity. He took part in public events, demonstrations, protests as a citizen of Ukraine, and also expressed his view to support and defend protesters as public figure and spiritual leader of Ukrainian Muslims.

2014
During bloody clashes occurred on February 22, 2014 (shooting of protestors), in interview to Hromadske TV, S. Ismagilow told about sin of fratricide and that representatives of all confessions, including Muslims, pray for peace in Ukraine and invoke to stop bloodshed. On February 21 in Islamic cultural center during Friday sermon dedicated to value of human life Mufti of the Religious Administration of Muslims of Ukraine “Ummah” Said Ismagilov addressed his speech to faithful brothers and sisters:

Moreover, in the statement to all citizens and politicians on behalf of RAMU “Ummah” he shared support of the communique made by All-Ukrainian Council of Churches and Religious Organizations during urgent meeting on January 22, 2014 in which members “call to stop bloodshed immediately, criticize using churches and religious organizations in political manipulations and ask for meeting with President of Ukraine and Opposition Leaders” (according to the text of statement). In the next statement to Ukrainian Muslims and Ukrainian nation S. Ismagilov told about birth of new Ukrainian society, problems and difficulties forthcoming on the path of its development. Then mufti stated that Ukrainian Muslims are integral and important part of Ukrainian society, and on behalf of RAMU “Ummah” he invoked all Muslims of our country to participate in the process of building of new Ukraine, which will be free from corruption and irresponsibility of all bodies of power, the country, in which principles of humanism will score a triumph.

Reaction to Russian annexation of Crimea

Due to deteriorating situation on Crimean peninsula on March 7 in mosques and Islamic cultural centers of the Religious Administration of Muslims of Ukraine “Ummah”, people prayed for Muslims in Crimea; Mufti Said Ismagilov expressed a concern, and mentioned that Ukrainian Muslims are concerned about military intervention on the South of Ukraine. He, as well as other religious figures of Donbas, participated in the press-conference of All-Ukrainian Council of Churches and Religious Organizations of Donetsk region (which RAMU “Ummah” is member of). During that conference, the statement to Ukrainian nation in connection with current situation in the country was read out. That document scored actions of neighboring country as international crime against humanity, rights and freedoms of Ukrainian nation, and also invoked to pray for peace, serenity, integrity and unity of our country. After Maidan and annexation of Crimea, S. Ismagilov have strengthened his public and missionary activity. He strongly condemns Russia's annexation of Crimea. He thinks that Muslim position in Russia is worse than in Ukraine, and Russian media is the principal in the first degree in war in Donbas region. In one of his statements, Mufti gave several examples of Islam freedom and development in Ukraine, and also addressed a request to all Muslims not to send foreign mercenary to Ukraine.

During events in Eastern Ukraine
Some time after the outbreak of Russia's war against Ukraine in Donbas, he was in Donetsk and Mariupol, covering events.

In an interview for Voice of America on 20 May 2014, he told that the main reason of supporting Ukraine by Muslims is that this country provides more rights and freedoms that brothers in faith have in Russia. Moreover, he expressed a fear that separation from Ukraine and increasing the influence of Russia would lead to worsening of position for religious ethnic minorities.

With representatives of other religions, he participated in releasing of catholic priest father Tyhon (Kulbaka) from captivity. He was an active participant of Interconfessional praying marathon “For peace and unity of Ukraine” (Donetsk city), which had started on March 4, 2014, and numerous demonstrations for peace in Donetsk city in the beginning of spring 2014.

2015
In statement dedicated to tragic events in France on January 7, 2015, S. Ismagilov expressed sympathy to the families of journalists of the French satirical journal Charlie Hebdo murdered in Paris. According to his statement:

Further, he as Mufti of the Muslims of Ukraine asked people not to follow the calls from those proposing to publish caricatures of Muhammad in all countries, especially in Ukraine, where mutual understanding and friendship between Ukrainians is very important against the background of the information and armed war against our country. He thought that not without reason Khodorkovsky had called for the publication of caricatures of Muhammad. S. Ismagilov asked journalists to be correct, not to incite resentment within the country over the crimes of individuals and expressed willingness to explain the position of Islam and answer questions.

Political career
S. Ismagilov participated in parliamentary election for the Verkhovna Rada on October 26, 2014 as a representative of All-Ukrainian Political Party “Ukraina – Jedyna Kraina” (“Ukraine – One Country”) in the multi-mandate all-state election constituency. He was the fourth in the electoral list of party.

Scientific career
During 2001-2002, he was a lecturer of theology and religious studies in Ukrainian Islamic university (Donetsk). He lectured religious studies in State Institute of Artificial Intellect of Donetsk. He took part in numerous Ukrainian and international scientific and practical conferences. 
In 2003, in cooperation with other scientists, he established All-Ukrainian Public Organization “Ukrainian Center for Islamic Studies” and further he was elected its President.
During conference “The third world in the context of development and global calls of XXI century”, S. Ismagilov brought out an opinion that distrust to Muslim political projects in the world are caused by fact that no one of them was allowed to be implemented.

References

1978 births
Living people
People from Donetsk
Volga Tatar people
Muftis
Ukrainian Islamic religious leaders
Crimean Tatar muftis
Ukrainian imams